Nishānt or Nishanth, is an Indian male name derived from the sandhi of Sanskrit words  meaning ‘night’ and  meaning ‘end’, .

People

 Nish Kumar (born 1985), British stand-up comedian
 Nishant Kumar (cricketer) (born 1988), Indian cricketer
 Nishant Pitti (born 1986), Indian businessman
 Nishant Singh Malkani (born 1987), Indian actor and model
 Nishant Shokeen, Indian film and television actor
 Nishant Tanwar (born 1982), Indian stand-up comedian also known as Joke Singh
 Nishanta Bordoloi (born 1977), Indian cricketer
 Nishanth Sagar (born Nishanth Balakrishnan in 1980), Indian actor
 Nishantha Fernando (born 1970), Sri Lankan cricketer
 Nishantha Fernando (carrom player), Sri Lankan carrom player
 Nishantha Kumara (born 1985), Sri Lankan cricketer
 Nishantha Muthuhettigamage, Sri Lankan member of parliament
 Nishantha Ranatunga (born 1966), Sri Lankan cricketer
 Nishantha Ulugetenne, Commander of the Sri Lanka Navy

Given names
Indian given names